Juan Pablo Cardenal Nicolau (Barcelona, 1968) is a Spanish journalist and writer.

He resides in Hong Kong where he works as a correspondent for the Spanish business newspaper El Economista. His research about Chinese affairs in the world has attracted international recognition.

Books
La silenciosa conquista china (Crítica, 2011, with Heriberto Araújo)

References

External links
 Blog - EL PAIS

1968 births
Living people
People from Barcelona
Spanish journalists
Spanish political writers
Writers about China